CW Hood Yachts is a boat builder, designer, and broker in Marblehead, Massachusetts. They produce a range of power and sailing vessels, from the 26 foot Wasque 26 through to the larger Hood 43, along with custom designs.

History
Owners Chris Hood and Chris Stirling founded the CW Hood Yacht Yard out of Chris's uncle Ted Hood's Little Harbor marine complex in 1991. The company moved to its current location in Marblehead, Massachusetts, in the mid-1990s.

Boats
Boats manufactured by CW Hood Yachts include:
Bremer 25
 Wasque 26
 Wasque 30
 Katama 32
 Hood 43
 Hood 50
 CW Hood 32

CW Hood Yachts also produce Downeast hulls from Jarvis Newman, with sizes ranging from 30 to 46 feet in length, and are authorized builders for the International One Design. Future designs include the Wasque 32.

Awards
CW Hood Yachts received the "Best Powerboat" award at the Newport International Boat Show for the Hood 43 in 2009. In 2011, the CW Hood 32 won "Best Daysailer" from both Sail Magazines Best Boats 2011 competition and Sailing Worlds Boat of the Year Awards.

See also
 International One Design
 List of sailboat designers and manufacturers

References

External links
CW Hood Yachts

CW Hood Yachts